A benefactor is a person who gives some form of help to benefit a person, group or organization (the beneficiary), often gifting a monetary contribution in the form of an endowment to help a cause. Benefactors are humanitarian leaders and charitable patrons providing assistance in many forms, such as an alumnus from a university giving back to a college or an individual providing assistance to others.

See also
 Patronage
 Sponsor (commercial)

References

Personal finance
Philanthropy